Saint Lars Church ruin is located in the central part of Visby  on the island of Gotland, Sweden.

History
The church has been named after Saint Lawrence (225–258),  one of the seven deacons of the city of Rome, Italy under Pope Sixtus II. 
Saint Lars Church was established probably around 1210-1220 as a Visby  parish church as a result of the population increase in Gotland.
Construction of the church began during the second quarter of the 12th century, with the choir being the oldest part of the building. 

St. Drotten's Church was built adjacent to Saint Lars Church around 1240 as the German language parish church in Visby. 
Both churches were  abandoned in connection with the Reformation in Sweden which King Gustav Vasa carried out in the 1530s.

In purely architectural terms, Saint Lars  differs in its form from other Visby churches. It was probably inspired by Byzantine architecture while the other churches in Visby were similar to the German church style.

Gallery

See also
List of church ruins on Gotland

References

Other Sources
Lagerlöf, Erland, ed. (1973)  Gotlands kyrkor  (Uddevalla: Rabén & Sjögren) 
Svahnström, Gunnar (1985)  Kyrkorna i Visby ( Stockholm:  Svenska kulturminnen)

Related reading
Svensson, Britta (1998) Guide to Visby (Uppsala: Almqvist & Wiksell Tryckeri)  
Marita Jonsson & Sven-Olof Lindqvist   (1997) Gateway to Gotland  (Uppsala: Almqvist & Wiksell Tryckeri)  
Roberts, Michael  (1968) The Early Vasas: A History of Sweden, 1523-1611 (Cambridge University Press) 

Church ruins in Sweden